Felix Agu (born 27 September 1999) is a German professional footballer who plays as a full-back for Werder Bremen. He has represented Germany internationally at U21 level.

Club career
In late January 2020, media reported that Agu would move to Bundesliga side Werder Bremen for the 2020–21 season having agreed a four-year contract with the club. With his VfL Osnabrück due to run out, he would join on a free transfer. In early February, the move was officially announced.

Agu made his Bundesliga debut in Werder Bremen's 1–1 draw against Bayern Munich on 21 November 2020, being brought on as a substitute in the 66th minute. He played in midfield instead of his usual full-back position. With first-choice left-back Ludwig Augustinsson sidelined through injury, Agu made his first Bundesliga appearance as a starter in a 2–0 win against FC Augsburg on 16 January 2021. He contributed with his first assist and his first goal in the league.

Agu agreed an extension of his contract with Werder Bremen in February 2022.

International career
Born in Germany, Agu is of Nigerian descent. He is a youth international for Germany, having appeared for the U21 side.

Career statistics

References

External links
 

1999 births
Living people
German sportspeople of Nigerian descent
Sportspeople from Osnabrück
German footballers
Association football midfielders
Germany under-21 international footballers
Bundesliga players
2. Bundesliga players
3. Liga players
VfL Osnabrück players
SV Werder Bremen players
21st-century German people